Skint may refer to:

Skint Records, an English electronic music record label based in Brighton
Skint (2005 TV series), a BBC television series
Skint (2013 TV series), a Channel 4 television series
Skint & Demoralised, a British pop act